William Fuller may refer to:

Politics
 William K. Fuller (1792–1883), U.S. Representative from New York
 William E. Fuller (1846–1918), U.S. Representative from Iowa

Sports
 William Fuller (athlete) (1904–?), Canadian Olympic sprinter
 Bill Fuller (footballer) (born 1944), defender for Crystal Palace F.C.
 William Fuller (American football) (born 1962), American football defensive end
 William Fuller (baseball) (1889–?), American baseball player
 William Fuller (rugby union) (1883–1957), New Zealand rugby union player
 Will Fuller (born 1994), American football wide receiver
 William "Homer" Fuller (1920–2007), American professional basketball player

Other
 Willie H. Fuller, Tuskegee Airman 
 William Fuller (priest) (c. 1580–1659), dean of Ely
 William Fuller (bishop) (1608–1675), bishop of Lincoln
 Captain William Fuller (16??–1695), English-born leader of the Puritan forces in the Battle of the Severn and Puritan governor of Maryland
 William Fuller (imposter) (1670–1733), English impostor
 William Fuller (banker) (1705–1800), English benefactor of nonconformist causes
 William Allen Fuller (1836–1905), conductor on the Western & Atlantic Railroad during the American Civil War era
 Chief William Fuller (1873–1958), Miwok Indian Chief, see Tuolumne County, California
 William Charles Fuller (1884–1974), VC recipient
 William Fuller (poet) (born 1953), U.S. poet

See also
 Will Furrer (born 1968), American football quarterback